Lucy Irvine (born 1 February 1956) is a British adventurer and author. She is known for spending a year on the uninhabited island of 
Tuin and for her book, Castaway, describing the experience.

Early life
Born in Whitton, London, Irvine had a tumultuous and free spirited adolescence, in which she replaced formal education with travel and adventure.
She first ran away from school at twelve and had no full-time schooling after her thirteenth birthday.

Before writing Castaway, she had been employed as a charlady, monkey keeper, waitress, stonemason's mate, life model, pastry cook, and concierge.

Books
In 1981, Irvine responded to an advert placed by writer Gerald Kingsland and they became intentional castaways for a year on the isolated and uninhabited island of Tuin, in the Torres Strait between New Guinea and Australia. In 1983, she published her account of the experience in Castaway, which was later used as the basis for the 1986 film of the same name. According to Irvine, the film, directed by Nicolas Roeg, is more about the relationship between an older man and a young woman than it is about her experiences on the island.

Following the success of Castaway, in 1985 she published Runaway about her life leading up to the decision to spend a year on Tuin. It describes how, while hitchhiking in Greece, she was raped at knife-point and subsequently suffered a mental breakdown.

She published her first novel One is One in 1989.

Irvine was approached by Diana Hepworth and her husband Tom to write their biography. In 1947, the two British expatriates set sail from England and embarked upon a hazardous journey in search of a faraway paradise where they could raise a family. They settled on Pigeon Island in the Solomons, running a trading business. Irvine accepted the invitation and in 1998 travelled to the Solomon Islands to immerse herself once again in island life. She was accompanied by her two youngest children and after a year, returned to write Faraway.

Personal life
In 1984, Irvine bought the isolated cottage Rumachroy, near Nairn in Scotland, where, most of the time as a single mother, she raised her three sons. In 2007, she moved to south-eastern Bulgaria.

She joined Mensa at the age of 16 and is a member of The Chelsea Arts Club.

Lucy has founded a registered  non-profit animal rescue called LIFE, Lucy Irvine Foundation Europe. It’s located in Bulgaria.
Working in the poorest region and working with Roma. 
There is a website and also a Facebook page.
Over 200 dogs have been successfully adopted to the UK and LIFE routinely holds SpayAThons as well.

References

External links

English travel writers
British women travel writers
1956 births
Living people
Castaways
Mensans